Kenneth Albert Arnold (March 29, 1915 – January 16, 1984) was an American aviator, businessman, and politician.

He is best known for making what is generally considered the first widely reported modern unidentified flying object sighting in the United States, after claiming to have seen nine unusual objects flying in tandem near Mount Rainier, Washington on June 24, 1947.   After his alleged sighting,  Arnold investigated reports of UFOs, writing and speaking about the topic for years to come.

In 1962, Arnold won the Republican Party's nomination for Lieutenant Governor of Idaho, losing in the general election.

Biography
Arnold was born on March 29, 1915 in Sebeka, Minnesota. He grew up in Scobey, Montana. He was an Eagle Scout and all-state football player in high school. He attended the University of Minnesota in 1934–35. His family was of Lutheran faith.

In 1938, he began work for Red Comet,  manufacturer of automatic firefighting equipment.  He was promoted to district manager the following year.  In 1940,  Arnold started his own company, the Great Western Fire Control Supply in Boise, Idaho, which sold and installed fire suppression system, a job that took him around the Pacific Northwest.

In 1941, Arnold married Doris Lowe; they had four daughters.

Role in UFO folklore

Arnold's 1947 UFO sighting

On June 24, 1947  Kenneth Arnold claimed that he saw a string of nine, shiny unidentified flying objects flying past Mount Rainier at speeds that Arnold estimated at a minimum of 1,200 miles an hour (1,932 km/hr). This was the first post-World War II sighting in the United States that garnered nationwide news coverage and is credited with being the first of the modern era of UFO sightings, including numerous reported sightings over the next two to three weeks. Arnold's description of the objects also led to the press quickly coining the terms flying saucer and flying disc as popular descriptive terms for UFOs.

Investigation of Maury Island UFO hoax

After the 1947 UFO sighting, Arnold became famous "practically overnight". Arnold's daughter would later recall the family receiving 10,000 letters and constant phone calls.

Arnold was contacted by Raymond A. Palmer, editor of fringe/sci-fi magazine Amazing Stories, who asked Arnold to investigate the story of two harbormen in Tacoma who reportedly possessed fragments of a "flying saucer". Palmer sent $200 to fund the investigation.

On July 29, Arnold interviewed a harborman who claimed that one of the objects "began spewing forth what seemed like thousands of newspapers from somewhere on the inside of its center. These newspapers, which turned out to be a white type of very light weight metal, fluttered to earth". The harborman claimed the craft emitted a substance resembling lava rocks that fell onto his boat, breaking a worker's arm and killing a dog.

Arnold interviewed Fred Crisman, an associate of the harborman, who reported having recovered debris from Maury Island and having witnessed an unusual craft. Crisman showed "white metal" debris to Arnold, who interpreted it as mundane and inconsistent with the harborman's description.

Arnold contacted the Air Force, and two officers soon arrived to investigate. The officers conducted interviews, collected the fragments, and took off in their plane to return to base. In the early hours of August 1, the two officers died when the B-25 Mitchell they were piloting crashed outside of Kelso, Washington on their way back to California.

Writing in 1956, Air Force officer Edward J. Ruppelt would conclude "The whole Maury Island Mystery was a hoax. The first, possibly the second-best, and the dirtiest hoax in the UFO history." Ruppelt observed:
The government had thought seriously of prosecuting the men. At the last minute it was decided, after talking to the two men, that the hoax was a harmless joke that had mushroomed, and that the loss of two lives and a B-25 could not be directly blamed on the two men.

Aftermath

Arnold was involved in interviewing other UFO witnesses or contactees (notably, he investigated the claims of Samuel Eaton Thompson, one of the first contactees).

In spring 1948, Arnold and Science Fiction editor Ray Palmer collaborated on an article titled "I Did See The Flying Disks", based on Arnold's sighting.  In 1950, Arnold self-published a 16-page booklet titled "The Flying Saucer As I Saw It". In 1948, he authored "Are Space Visitors Here?" and "Phantom Lights in Nevada".

On April 7, 1950, broadcaster Edward R. Murrow interviewed Arnold, who stated that since June 1947 he had had three additional sightings of nine spacecraft.

In January 1951, Cosmopolitan magazine published an article titled "The Disgraceful Flying Saucer Hoax", which accused Arnold of  "[igniting] a chain reaction of mass hypnotism and fraud that has taken on the guise of a prolonged 'Martian Invasion' broadcast by that bizarre hambone Orson Welles".

In 1952, Arnold and Palmer authored The Coming of the Saucers.

Reportedly, Arnold came to believe he had seven additional sightings, one of which involved a transparent saucer he likened to a jellyfish.

Political career and later life
In 1962, Kenneth Arnold announced plans to run for Governor of Idaho and won the Republican nomination for the 1962 Idaho lieutenant gubernatorial election; in the general election, Arnold lost to incumbent Democrat W. E. Drevlow. In 1964, Arnold publicly campaigned for Republican presidential nominee Barry Goldwater, flying a plane painted with Goldwater '64 slogan "Au-H2O-64".  

He appeared at a 1977 convention curated by Fate magazine to mark the thirtieth anniversary of the "birth" of the modern UFO age.

In 1984, Kenneth Arnold, aged 68, died from colon cancer at Overlake Hospital in Bellevue, Washington.

Bibliography
 The Real Flying Saucers, Other Worlds (January 1952)
 The Coming of the Saucers (1952) (with Raymond A. Palmer)

References

Sources

 
 Clark, Jerome, The UFO Encyclopedia: The Phenomenon from the Beginning, Volume 2, A–K, Detroit: Omnigraphics, 1998 (2nd edition, 2005), 
 Campbell, Steuart, The UFO Mystery Solved, Explicit Books, 1994, 
 Obituary, Idaho Statesman, January 22, 1984

External links

 The Singular Adventure of Mr Kenneth Arnold
 The Positively True Story of Kenneth Arnold – Part One 10-part series at Saturday Night Uforia
 Resolving Arnold part 1
 Resolving Arnold part 2
 

1915 births
1984 deaths
20th-century American people
University of Minnesota alumni
People from Wadena County, Minnesota
American aviators
People from Scobey, Montana
People associated with ufology
Maury Island incident
1947 flying disc craze
Deaths from colorectal cancer
Deaths from cancer in Washington (state)